Upstate New York, broadly defined as part of New York north of New York City and Westchester County, is home to several skyscrapers and high-rises. New York City, the largest city in the United States, is home to the vast majority of the skyscrapers in New York; outside the city, most of the state's skyscrapers are concentrated in Albany, Buffalo and Rochester. The tallest building in Upstate New York is the 44-story Erastus Corning Tower, which rises  in Albany, the state's capital city. Although the building is the tallest in the upstate region by a significant margin, it does not appear in the 100-tallest buildings in New York state when New York City skyscrapers are included in the ranking.

Tallest buildings

This includes spires and architectural details but does not include antenna masts. An equal sign (=) following a rank indicates the same height between two or more buildings. The "Year" column indicates the year in which a building was completed.

Timeline of tallest buildings
This section lists buildings that once held the title of tallest building in Upstate New York. Saint Paul's Episcopal Cathedral held the title twice, both before the construction and after the demolition of the original Electric Tower, which was designed as a temporary building that would only last the length of the Pan-American Exposition.

Buildings in Westchester County ranked by floor count
Due to Westchester County bordering New York City, the following are not included in the main list:

See also

List of tallest buildings by city
 List of tallest buildings in New York City
 List of tallest buildings in Brooklyn
List of tallest buildings in Queens
 List of tallest buildings in Albany, New York
 List of tallest buildings in Buffalo
 List of tallest buildings in Rochester, New York
 List of tallest buildings in Syracuse, New York

References

Upstate New York
Upstate New York